Harold Wynne Webster (17 February 1889 – 7 October 1949) was a cricketer for South Australia who played first-class cricket from March 1911 to October 1912.

A wicket-keeper, he toured England with Australia for the 1912 Triangular Tournament, but he did not play Test cricket.

References

External links
 
 

1889 births
1949 deaths
Australian cricketers
South Australia cricketers
Cricketers from Sydney